General elections were held in Liberia in 1897. In the presidential election, incumbent William D. Coleman of the True Whig Party (the sole legal party) was elected. The former Vice-President had originally taken office following the death of President Joseph James Cheeseman in November 1896.

References

Liberia
1897 in Liberia
Elections in Liberia
One-party elections
Election and referendum articles with incomplete results